Isabel San Sebastián Cabasés (born 15 March 1959) is a Spanish journalist and writer.

Biography

Early years
The daughter of a Spanish diplomat, Isabel San Sebastián was born in Santiago, Chile. Her ancestry is Basque and Navarrese, and she is the cousin of Pamplona politician . After graduating in Information Sciences from the Complutense University of Madrid, she joined the newspaper  in Bilbao. From there she jumped to writing for national media such as the magazine Época and the newspaper ABC, where she began to write the political column "El contrapunto", and where she remained from 1989 to 2000.

1997–1998
In 1997, she went into public media at the request of the new RTVE director, . At Radio Nacional de España, she began to appear in September of that year, both on the recently launched morning program Buenos días con  and the nighttime program 24 Horas.

At Televisión Española (TVE), San Sebastián was offered the opportunity to present the interview show  (which premiered with an interview with Ana Botella, wife of then President José María Aznar), besides working on the morning news program Los Desayunos de TVE.

1998–2002

The exit was framed in the context of a tough confrontation between Pedro J. Ramírez, director of the newspaper El Mundo and César Alierta, president of Telefónica, majority shareholder of the network at that time. According to the journalist herself, who worked in both media (she had joined the editorial staff of El Mundo in March 2000), she was pressured to leave the newspaper. Faced with her refusal, Antena 3 acted, in her words, "repressing her."

2002–2006
At that moment, Luis Herrero on Cadena COPE and María Teresa Campos on television, both critics of the way in which the journalist was fired, offered her a spot on their respective political tertulias.

2007–present

In 2007 she participated in the political tertulias of the TVE program  and Telemadrid's Alto y Claro. On the latter, a verbal clash with the journalist José María Calleja led to him leaving the show that January. At the beginning of November of the same year, it was Isabel San Sebastián who left the set of 59 segundos due to the allegations that Calleja had leveled at her, accusing her of "having fattened ETA". Due to this she filed a legal claim for protection of honor. In July 2010, the Court of First Instance ordered Calleja to pay €12,000 to San Sebastián. The ruling was overturned by the Supreme Court in November 2014, which "placed the conflict in the field of freedom of expression and the right to honor, and concluded that this was prevalent in this case inasmuch as the accused journalist limited himself to making a criticism regarding a subject of interest and in a context of previous confrontation."

From September 2008 to June 2009 she took part in the tertulia of the program La mirada crítica, presented by María Teresa Campos.

From 6 September 2010 to 19 December 2012 she hosted the political analysis program Alto y Claro on Telemadrid.

Books
 Mayor Oreja, una victoria frente al miedo (2001)
 Los años de plomo, memoria en carne viva de las víctimas (2003)
 El árbol y las nueces, with Carmen Gurruchaga (2000)
 ¿A qué juegan nuestros hijos? (2004), with Javier San Sebastián
 Cuentos de María la gorda (2005)
  (novel, 2006)
 Fungairiño: El enemigo de ETA (2007)
  (novel, 2008)
 Imperator (novel, 2010)
 Un reino lejano (novel, 2012)
 La mujer del diplomático (novel, 2014), Editorial Plaza & Janés Editores, 
 Lo último que verán tus ojos (novel, 2016), Editorial Plaza & Janés,

References

External links

 
 

1959 births
21st-century Spanish novelists
21st-century Spanish women writers
Complutense University of Madrid alumni
Living people
Spanish columnists
Spanish historical novelists
Spanish political commentators
Spanish radio presenters
Spanish television journalists
Spanish television presenters
Spanish women journalists
Spanish women novelists
Spanish women radio presenters
Women television journalists
Writers from Santiago
Spanish women columnists
Spanish women television presenters